Iljine is a surname, eg. a romanised form of . Notable people with the surname include:

 Diana Iljine (born 1964), German communication scientist, director of Filmfest München
 Nicolas Iljine (born 1944), French and Russian author, editor, curator, and art consultant